Michael Johan Sebastian Wiander, (born 4 March 1974 in Ekenäs) is a Swedish children's book author. Wiander debuted in 2017 when releasing the book Morfars hemlighet.

Wiander is also a chess player and in 1989 he won the Swedish championship in the game.

References
2017 – Morfars hemlighet (Stevali), 
2018 – Flykten från vulkanön (Stevali), 
2019 – Fångar i Luxor (Stevali), 
2019 – Marias kockskola (Grenadine; illustrerad av Peter Jönsson),

References 

Living people
1974 births
Swedish writers